Bice Vanzetta (born 7 March 1961) is an Italian cross-country skier who competed from 1986 to 1994.

Biography
She won two bronze medals at the Winter Olympics in the 4 × 5 km relay (1992, 1994). Vanzetta's best finish at the Winter Olympics was 19th in the 5 km event in 1994.

She also won two silver medals in the 4 × 5 km relay at the FIS Nordic World Ski Championships (1991, 1993). Vanzetta's best individual finish at the World Championships was 12th in the 5 km event in 1991.

Vanzetta's best career individual finish was third in an FIS race in 1992 in Italy.

She is the younger sister of four time Olympic medalist Giorgio Vanzetta.

Cross-country skiing results
All results are sourced from the International Ski Federation (FIS).

Olympic Games
2 medals – (2 bronze)

World Championships
 2 medals – (2 silver)

World Cup

Season standings

Team podiums
 4 podiums

Note:  Until the 1999 World Championships and the 1994 Olympics, World Championship and Olympic races were included in the World Cup scoring system.

References

External links
 
 
 
 

1961 births
Living people
Italian female cross-country skiers
Olympic cross-country skiers of Italy
Olympic bronze medalists for Italy
Olympic medalists in cross-country skiing
Cross-country skiers at the 1988 Winter Olympics
Cross-country skiers at the 1992 Winter Olympics
Cross-country skiers at the 1994 Winter Olympics
Medalists at the 1994 Winter Olympics
Medalists at the 1992 Winter Olympics
FIS Nordic World Ski Championships medalists in cross-country skiing